Belize participated in the 2010 Summer Youth Olympics in Singapore.

Athletics

Note: The athletes who do not have a "Q" next to their Qualification Rank advance to a non-medal ranking final.

Boys
Track and Road Events

Girls
Track and Road Events

References

2010 in Belizean sport
Belize at the Youth Olympics